Teddy William Howe (born 9 October 1998) is an English professional footballer who plays as a defender for Weymouth. He has previously played for Reading, Blackpool, Scunthorpe United and Barnet. He is the son of Reading director Nigel Howe.

Career

Reading
A product of the academy, Howe signed his first professional contract with Reading in February 2017. On 26 February 2019, Howe extended his contract with the Royals until the summer of 2021. He made his first appearance for Reading against Birmingham City on 5 May 2019.

Blackpool
Howe signed for Blackpool on 31 January 2020, in a two-and-a-half-year deal, plus an option to extend for a further twelve months. On 1 February 2021, Howe joined League Two side Scunthorpe United on loan for the remainder of the 2020–21 season.

He was released by Blackpool by mutual consent on 18 January 2022.

Barnet
Howe signed for Barnet on 24 January 2022. He left the Bees at the end of the season after 18 appearances.

Weymouth
On 23 September 2022, Howe signed for National League South strugglers Weymouth.

Career statistics

Club

References

External links
Teddy Howe – Soccerbase
 
 Reading Profile

1998 births
Living people
English footballers
Association football defenders
Reading F.C. players
Blackpool F.C. players
Scunthorpe United F.C. players
Barnet F.C. players
Weymouth F.C. players
English Football League players
National League (English football) players